Girl Guides (known as Girl Scouts in the United States and some other countries) is a worldwide movement, originally and largely still designed for girls and women only. The movement began in 1909 when girls requested to join the then-grassroots Boy Scout Movement.

The movement developed in diverse ways in a variety of places around the world. In some places, girls joined or attempted to join preexisting Scouting organizations. In other places, all girl groups were started independently; some would later open up to boys, while others merged with boys' organizations.  In other cases, mixed-gender groups were formed, some of which sometimes later disbanded. In the same way, the name "Girl Guide" or "Girl Scout" has been used by a variety of groups across different times and places.

The World Association of Girl Guides and Girl Scouts (WAGGGS) was formed in 1928 and has member organisations in 145 countries. WAGGGS celebrated the centenary of the international Girl Guiding and Girl Scouting Movement over three years, from 2010 to 2012.

History

Lieutenant-General Robert Baden-Powell was a British soldier during the Second Anglo-Boer War in South Africa (1899–1902). He was the commander during the Siege of Mafeking, and noted during the siege how young boys made themselves useful by carrying messages for the soldiers. When he came home, he decided to put his Scouting ideas into practice to see if they would work for young boys, and took 21 boys camping on Brownsea Island, near Poole in Dorset on 1 August 1907. The camp was a success, and Baden-Powell subsequently wrote the book Scouting for Boys. The book covered topics such as tracking, signalling, and cooking, and it outlined a method for an "instruction in good citizenship". Soon boys began to organise themselves into patrols and troops and calling themselves "Boy Scouts". Girls bought the book as well and formed themselves into patrols of "Girl Scouts", while some girls and boys formed mixed patrols.

In those days, camping and hiking were not common activities for girls, as shown in an excerpt from The Boy Scouts Headquarters Gazette of 1909: "If a girl is not allowed to run, or even hurry, to swim, ride a bike, or raise her arms above her head, how can she become a Scout?" Nevertheless, Girl Scouts were registered at Scout Headquarters. In 1909, there was a Boy Scout rally at Crystal Palace in London. Among the thousands of Scouts at the rally were several hundred Girl Scouts, including a group of girls from Peckham Rye who had no tickets to the event and asked that Baden-Powell let them join in. Following negative publicity in The Spectator magazine, Baden-Powell decided that a separate, single-sex organisation would be best. Baden-Powell asked his sister, Agnes Baden-Powell, to form a separate Girl Guides organisation. In 1910, The Girl Guides Association was formed in the United Kingdom. Other influential women in the history of the movement were Juliette Gordon Low, founder of the Girl Scouts of the USA, Olga Drahonowska-Małkowska in Poland and Antoinette Butte in France. The first Girl Guide company to be registered was 1st Pinkneys Green Guides (Miss Baden-Powell's Own), who still exist in Pinkneys Green, Maidenhead, Berkshire. Many Girl Guide and Girl Scout groups trace their roots to this point.

Baden-Powell chose the name "Guides" for the organisation from a regiment in the British Indian Army, the Corps of Guides, which served on the Northwest Frontier and was noted for its skills in tracking and survival. In some countries, the girls preferred to call themselves "Girl Scouts".

Guide International Service

The Guide International Service was an organisation set up by the Girl Guides Association in Britain in 1942. Their aim was to send teams of adult Girl Guides to Europe after World War II to aid with relief work. The work of the organisation is described in two books: All Things Uncertain by Phyllis Stewart Brown and Guides Can Do Anything by Nancy Eastick. A total of 198 Guiders and 60 Scouts, drawn from Britain, Australia, Canada, Ireland and Kenya, worked in teams during the relief efforts. Some went to relieve the Bergen-Belsen displaced persons camp, while others served in British Malaya.

Single-sex mission
There has been much discussion about how similar Girl Guiding and Girl Scouting should be to boys' Scouting programmes. While many girls have sought to follow similar practices as boys' groups, some girls' organisations have sought to avoid simply copying or mimicking the activities of boys' organisations. Julie Bentley, appointed chief executive of the United Kingdom Girl Guides in 2012, described the Girl Guides in an interview with The Times as "the ultimate feminist organisation".

Even when most Scout organisations became mixed-sex, Guiding remained sex-separated in most countries to provide a female-centred programme. For example, the UK Scout Association introduced a mixed-sex group in 1976 with the Venture Scout programme, which opened to all age-based sections in 1991 and became fully co-educational in 2007. However, Girl Guiding in the UK remains limited to girls.

Transgender girls are admitted to units in some countries. Transgender women are also allowed to become leaders in some countries, including the UK.

Key points

Things that are shared amongst all Guide Units are:
The Guide Promise – Girls become Guides by making their Promise. Each country's organisation has its own Promise, but historically all have the same three parts: duty to God or to your beliefs, duty to your country, and keeping the Guide Law. Though there was historically a religious aspect, many countries are moving towards non-religious Promises.
The Good Turn – Each Guide tries to do a kind thing for someone else, without payment and without being asked, every day.
The World Badge – This can be worn on uniform or ordinary clothes. The three leaves of the trefoil stand for the threefold Promise. The vein in the centre is a compass needle, pointing the way and the two stars stand for the Promise and the Law. The colours stand for the golden sun shining over all the children of the world, from a blue sky. This badge is a guiding symbol that can be recognized all over the world.
The World Flag – This is in the same colours as the World Badge and can be carried or flown by any member of the movement. It is often used as a unit flag. The three yellow blocks represent the threefold Promise and the white corner represents the commitment to peace of all WAGGGs' members.
The Guide Sign – The three fingers stand for the three parts of the Promise. The Guide sign is used when making or renewing the Promise and can be used when meeting other Guides. It may also be used when receiving a badge or at the end of meetings.
The Motto – "Be Prepared" – This means that Guides are ready to cope with anything that might come their way.
The left handshake – This is the way members of the movement greet each other. The left hand is used because it is the one nearest the heart, symbolizing friendship. Additionally, warriors held their shield in the left hand, so putting down one's shield to shake with one's left hand means that they are vulnerable, making it a display of both bravery and trust.
World Thinking Day – On February 22 each year, Guides think of their Guide sisters all around the world. The date was chosen at a World Conference because it was the birthday of both the Founder and the World Chief Guide.
 The World Centres – There are five World Centres in different parts of the world: Our Chalet in Switzerland; Pax Lodge in London; Our Cabana in Mexico; Sangam in India; and Kusafiri in Africa.
 The World Chief Guide – Olave Baden-Powell is the only person ever to have been World Chief Guide. She was the wife of founder Lord Baden-Powell and lived from 1889 to 1977.

Two central themes have been present from the earliest days of the movement: domestic skills and "a kind of practical feminism which embodies physical fitness, survival skills, camping, citizenship training, and career preparation". These two themes have been emphasized differently at different times and by different groups, but have remained central to Girl Guiding and Girl Scouting.

Uniforms
Individual national or other emblems may be found on the individual country's Scouting article.

The uniform is a specific characteristic of all Scouting movements. Robert Baden-Powell said it "hides all differences of social standing in a country and makes for equality; but, more important still, it covers differences of country and race and creed, and makes all feel that they are members with one another of the one great brotherhood".

In the 1909 The Scheme for Girl Guides, the uniform for the newly emerging movement was given as:
Jersey of company colour. Neckerchief of company colour. Skirt, knickers, stockings, dark blue. Cap – red biretta, or in summer, large straw hat. Haversack, cooking billy, lanyard and knife, walking stick or light staff. Cape, hooked up on the back. Shoulder knot, of the 'Group' colour on the left shoulder. Badges, much the same as the Boy Scouts. Officers wear ordinary country walking-dress, with biretta of dark blue, white shoulder knot, walking stick, and whistle on lanyard.

Guide uniforms vary according to cultures, climates and the activities undertaken. They are often adorned with badges indicating a Guide's achievements and responsibilities. In some places, uniforms are manufactured and distributed by approved companies and the local Guiding organisation. In other places, members make uniforms themselves.

Further reading

See also 

 List of World Association of Girl Guides and Girl Scouts members
 100 Years of Girl Guides

Sections
 Rainbow
 Brownies
 Girl Guide and Girl Scout
 Ranger Guide

References

External links
The World Association of Girl Guides and Girl Scouts

Girl Guiding and Girl Scouting
Scouting

vi:Nữ Hướng đạo